Meatball soup is a soup made using meatballs, simmered with various other ingredients. The classic meatball soup consists of a clear broth, often with pieces of or whole meatballs with vegetables; common additions are pasta (e.g., noodles, although almost any form can be used), dumplings, or grains such as rice and barley. Various types of meat are used, such as beef, lamb, pork and poultry.

Varieties
 Bakso
 Ciorbă de perișoare
 Sulu köfte

See also 

 Analı kızlı soup
 Bakso
 Ciorbă de perişoare
 Harput meatballs
 Hochzeitssuppe
 List of meatball dishes
 List of soups
 Smyrna meatballs
 Tabriz meatballs
 Yuvarlak

References

External links

Meatball soup recipe (with detailed photos) 

Meatballs
Soups
Halloween food
Australian soups